This is a list of people with surname O'Neill, including the variant spellings O'Neil and O'Neal.

People

A
Alan O'Neill (footballer, born 1957), Irish football player
Alan O'Neill (footballer, born 1973), Irish football player
Alexander O'Neal (born 1953), American musician
Alexandre O'Neill (1924–1986), Portuguese writer
Alexander O'Neill aka Alexx O'Nell (born 1980), American musician and actor
Amber O'Neal (born 1974), American professional wrestler
Amos O'Neal, American politician
Amy O'Neill (born 1971), an actress/performer
Ana María O'Neill, an educator, author and advocate of women's rights
Andrew O'Neill (born 1979), English vegan, anarchist, transvestite, stand-up comedian, musician and writer
Anthony O'Neill (born 1964), Australian fiction writer
Aisling O'Neill, Irish actress
April O'Neil, a fictional character in the Teenage Mutant Ninja Turtles franchise
Arthur Joseph O'Neill (1917–2013), an American bishop of the Roman Catholic Church
Arthur O'Neill (1876–1914), was an Irish Ulster Unionist Party politician
Arturo O'Neill (1736–1814), an Irish-born colonel who served the Spanish crown as governor of several places in New Spain (1781–1794)

B
Barbara O'Neil, an American film and stage actress
 Bernie O'Neill (politician), member of the Pennsylvania House of Representatives
 Bernie O'Neill (bowls), Northern Irish lawn bowler
 Bernie O'Neill (Gaelic footballer) (born 1945), Irish Gaelic footballer
Bill O'Neill (1880–1920), a Canadian-born Major League Baseball player
Billy O'Neill (rugby) (1878–1955), a Welsh international rugby union player
Billy O'Neill (footballer), an Irish professional footballer
Brendan O'Neill (businessman) (born 1948), a British business executive
Brendan O'Neill (journalist), an English journalist
Brian O'Neill (ice hockey, born 1929), a Canadian executive within the National Hockey League
Brian O'Neill (ice hockey, born 1988), American ice hockey player
Brian O'Neill (1574), chief of the O'Neills of Clanaboy, surrendering his title to Sir Philip Sidney for a knighthood in 1567
Brian O'Neill (superintendent) (1941–2009), an American superintendent of the Golden Gate National Recreation Area
Brian O'Neill (American football) (born 1995), American football player
Bryan O'Neil (1905–1954), British archaeologist and historian
Buckey O'Neill (1860–1898), an American soldier, sheriff, newspaper editor, miner, politician, gambler and lawyer
Byron O'Neill (born 1970), an American artist

C
Calvin O'Neal, American football linebacker
Carol O'Neal (born 1948), American model and Playboy magazine's Playmate of the Month in July 1972
Catherine O'Neill (cricketer), New Zealand-born Irish cricketer
Charles Duncan O'Neal (1879–1936), Barbados politician and physician
Charles O'Neal (1904–1996), American film and television screenwriter
Christopher John O'Neill, Broadway actor
Chris O'Neill, Irish animator and YouTuber
Connor O'Neill, fictional Northern Irish character in the Australian soap opera Neighbours
C. William O'Neill (1916–1978), American politician
Carlos O'Neill (1760–1835), titular head of the Clanaboy O'Neill dynasty
Cecily O'Neill, authority on Process drama and the arts in education
Charles O'Neill (musician), Canadian bandmaster and composer
Charles O'Neill (engineer) (1828–1900), Australasian engineer, inventor, parliamentarian and philanthropist
Charles H. O'Neill (c. 1800–1897), Irish-born American politician and mayor
Charles O'Neill (Pennsylvania politician) (1821–1893), American politician
Charles O'Neill, 1st Earl O'Neill (1779–1841), British politician, peer and landowner
Chloe Ann O'Neil (1943–2018), New York politician
Christopher O'Neill (born 1974), British-American businessman and the husband of Princess Madeleine of Sweden
Cian O'Neill, Irish Gaelic footballer, coach and manager
Colm O'Neill (born 1964), Irish sportsperson
Colm O'Neill (born 1988), Irish sportsperson
Con O'Neill (actor) (born 1966), British actor
Con O'Neill (diplomat) (1912–1988), British civil servant and diplomat
Conn (Constantine) O'Neill, titular head of the Clanaboy O'Neill dynasty

D
Dave O'Neal (1937–2021), American politician, Lieutenant Governor of Illinois
Deltha O'Neal (born 1977), American football player
Dipika O'Neill Joti (born 1977), Turkish actor and model
Damian O'Neill (born 1961), lead guitarist in the pop-punk band, The Undertones
Dan O'Neill (born 1942), American underground cartoonist
Dan O'Neill (writer), American journalist and writer
Daniel O'Neill (painter) (1920–1974), Irish Romantic painter
Daniel O'Neill (editor), Irish-born American newspaper editor and owner
Daria O'Neill (born 1971), American radio and television personality
Darren O'Neill, an Irish boxer
Dennis O'Neill (disambiguation), several people
Dermot O'Neill (disambiguation), several people
Diarmuid O'Neill (1969–1996), English-born volunteer in the Provisional Irish Republican Army
Dick O'Neill (1928–1998), American stage, film and television actor
Don O'Neill (artist), American watercolorist and architect
Donal O'Neill, Gaelic footballer for Galway
Douglas F. O'Neill (born 1968), American Thoroughbred horse trainer

E
Eamon O'Neill (born 1944), Northern Irish nationalist politician in Northern Ireland
Eamonn O'Neill (died 3 November 1954), Irish Cumann na nGaedhael and later Fine Gael party politician
Edward O'Neill (disambiguation), several people
Ed O'Neill (born 1946), American actor
Ed O'Neal (born 1936), American musician, of the Dixie Melody Boys
Edward J. O'Neill (general) (1902–1979), American US Army officer
Edward L. O'Neill (1903–1948), American politician
Edward O'Neill, 2nd Baron O'Neill (1839–1928), arish peer and politician
Eliza O'Neill (1791 – 29 October 1872), Irish actress, later baronetess
Elizabeth O'Neill Verner (1883–1979), artist, author and lecturer
Ella O'Neill, mother of playwright Eugene O'Neill and wife of actor James O'Neill
Emmett O'Neill (1918–1993), American Major League Baseball pitcher
Eric O'Neill (born 1973), American former American FBI operative
Eugene M. O'Neill (1850–1926), Irish-born American lawyer and newspaper owner
Eugene O'Neill (hurler) (born 1978), Irish sportsperson
Eugene O'Neill (1888–1953), American playwright, and Nobel laureate in Literature
Eunan O'Neill (born 1982), Northern Irish television presenter
Evan O'Neill Kane (1861–1932), surgeon working in Pennsylvania, US
Edward Asbury O'Neal (1818–1890), American Confederate general during the American Civil War
Emmet O'Neal (1853–1922), American Democratic politician who was Governor of Alabama

F
Frank O'Neal, American cartoonist
Frederick O'Neal (1905–1992), American actor and television director
Fabián O'Neill (born 1973), Uruguayan former football midfielder
Felim O'Neill of Kinard, Irish nobleman who led the Irish Rebellion of 1641 in Ulster
Francis O'Neill (1848–1936), Irish-born American police chief and author of several Irish music collections
Frank "Buck" O'Neill (1875–1958), American head football coach
Frank O'Neill (footballer) (born 1940), Irish footballer

G
Gail O'Neill, American model and television journalist
Gary O'Neill, various people
Gene O'Neill, American novelist
George Bernard O'Neill (1828–1917), Irish genre painter
George O'Neill (born 1942), Scottish footballer who played and managed in the US in his later career
George O'Neill (footballer, born 1923) (1923–2003), English footballer
Gerard K. O'Neill (1927–1992), American scientist
Gerard M. O'Neill (1942–2019), American journalist and writer
Griffin O'Neal (born 1964), American actor

H
Harriet O'Neill, American judge
Harry O'Neill (disambiguation), several people
Heather O'Neill (born 1973), Canadian novelist, poet, short story writer, screenwriter and journalist
Henrique O'Neill, 1st Viscount of Santa Mónica, Portuguese noble and politician
Henry O'Neill (disambiguation), several people
Howard S. O'Neill (1883–1966), American politician and lawyer
Hugh McShane O'Neill, Irish nobleman and rebel in the 16th and 17th centuries
Hugh O'Neill (disambiguation), several people
Hugo José Jorge O'Neill (1874–1940), Portuguese nobleman

I
Isabelle Ahearn O'Neill (1880–1975), stage and screen actor and Rhode Island legislator
Ivan O'Neal, Vincentian political leader

J
Jack O'Neill, a fictional character in the Canadian-American SyFy television series Stargate SG-1
Jamie O'Neal (born Jamie Murphy, 1968), Australian country singer and songwriter
Jermaine O'Neal (born 1978), American NBA basketball player
Jim O'Neal (born 1948), American blues expert, writer, record producer and record company executive
Joseph T. O'Neal, American politician
Johnny O'Neal, American jazz pianist
Jack O'Neill (baseball) (1873–1935), Irish-American baseball catcher
Jack O'Neill (businessman) (1923–2017), American businessman
Jack O'Neill (disambiguation)
Jacquie O'Neill (born 1969), English illustrator
James O'Neill (disambiguation), several people
Jamie O'Neill (born 1962), Irish authoer
Jamie O'Neill (snooker player), English snooker player
Jan Lehane (born 1941), married name O'Neill, Australian tennis player
Jeff O'Neill (born 1976), Canadian broadcaster and former ice hockey player
Jeffrey O'Neill (disambiguation), several people
Jennifer O'Neill, American actress and model
Jevon O'Neill, British film director and producer
Jim O'Neill (disambiguation), several people
Jimmy O'Neill (footballer, born 1931) (1930–2007), Irish football goalkeeper
Jimmy O'Neill (footballer, born 1941), Northern Irish footballer
João O'Neill
João Pedro Torlades O'Neill
Joaquim Torlades O'Neill
Joe O'Neill, English footballer
John Johnston O'Neill (1886–1966), Canadian geologist and academic
John Joseph O'Neill (journalist) (1889–1953), American journalist
John Joseph O'Neill (British politician) (1888–1953), English Liberal MP
John Joseph O'Neill (American politician) (1846–1898), U.S. Representative from Missouri
John O'Neill (disambiguation), several people
John Raymond O'Neill, Canadian politician
Jonjo O'Neill (born 1952), Irish National Hunt racehorse trainer and jockey
Jorge Maria O'Neill
Jorge Torlades O'Neill I
Jorge Torlades O'Neill II
José Carlos O'Neill
José Maria O'Neill
Joseph O'Neill (disambiguation), several people
Julian O'Neill (New Zealand rugby league), New Zealand rugby league footballer who played in England
Julian O'Neill, Australia rugby league footballer
Juliet O'Neill, Canadian journalist

K
Kathleen O'Neal Gear (born 1954), American writer
Kate Tenforde (née O'Neill; born 1980), American long-distance runner
Katie O'Neill, illustrator and writer from New Zealand
Keith O'Neill (disambiguation), several people
Ken O'Neal (born 1962), American football player
Kevin O'Neill (disambiguation), several people
Kim L. O'Neill, Irish biologist in the United States
Kitty O'Neil (1946–2018), American stuntwoman and racer

L
Leslie O'Neal (born 1964), American football player
Laurence O'Neill, Irish politician
Lawrence Joseph O'Neill, American judge
Lawrence O'Neill (disambiguation), several people
Linda O'Neill, Australian soccer player
Louis O'Neill, American diplomat and attorney
Luke O'Neill (disambiguation), several people

M
Madeline O'Neill (born 1867/68), British tennis player
Maggie O'Neill, British actress
Máire O'Neill (born 1978), Irish data encryption academic
Maire O'Neill (1886– 1952), Irish actress
Margaret O'Neill Eaton (1799–1879), wife of John Eaton, involved in the Petticoat Affair
María de Mater O'Neill (born 1960), Puerto Rican artist, designer and educator
Maria O'Neill, Portuguese member of the Clanaboy O'Neill dynasty
Mark O'Neill (disambiguation), several people
Martha Mary O'Neill, aka 'Mother Patricia', Irish-Australian Sister of Charity
Martin O'Neill, Baron O'Neill of Clackmannan
Martin O'Neill, Northern Irish footballer and manager
Marty O'Neill (born 1965), Canadian lacrosse player and manager
Mary Auguste O'Neill
Mary Devenport O'Neill, Irish poet
Mary O'Neill, Canadian politician
Mary-Anne O'Neill, Australian politician
Mary Lovelace O'Neal, American artist
Mary Thomas O'Neal (1887 – after 1974), Welsh-born American labor activist 
Maston E. O'Neal Jr. (1907–1990), American politician
Matthew O'Neill (disambiguation), several people
Maurice O'Neill (Irish republican), (d.1942), Executed Irish Republican
Melinda O'Neal, American conductor of choral music
Merlin O'Neill (1898–1981), Commandant of the United States Coast Guard 1950 to 1954
Michael O'Neill (disambiguation), several people
Michelle O'Neill, Irish politician, deputy First Minister of Northern Ireland since 2020, Vice President of Sinn Féin since 2018
Mike O'Neal (born 1951), Kansas Republican politician
Mildred O'Neill (1914? – 2003), wife of Speaker of the United States House of Representatives Tip O'Neill
Moira O'Neill, pseudonym of Agnes Shakespeare Higginson (1864–1955), Irish-Canadian poet
Morgan O'Neill, Australian writer, director, actor and producer

N
Nathan O'Neill, Australian cyclist
Nicholas O'Neill (disambiguation), several people
Norm O'Neill, Australian cricketer
Norman O'Neill (1875–1934), English composer and conductor

O
Onora O'Neill, Baroness O'Neill of Bengarve
Oona O'Neill, American actress
Owen Roe O'Neill (c.1585 – 1649), Gaelic Irish soldier
O'Neal Compton (1951–2019), American film and television actor
O'Neill Donaldson (born 1969), English footballer
O'Neill Spencer (1909–1944), American jazz drummer and singer
Sir Neil O'Neill, Irish chieftain

P
Patrice O'Neal (1969–2011), American comedian
Patrick O'Neal (disambiguation), several people
Peggy O'Neal (disambiguation), several people
Pete O'Neal (born 1940), American Black Panther Party member
Pat O'Neill (disambiguation), several people
Patrick O'Neill (disambiguation), several people
Paul O'Neill (disambiguation), several people
Pauline O'Neill (disambiguation), several people
Pearse O'Neill, Irish Gaelic footballer
Peggy O'Neil (1898–1960), Irish-American actress
Peter O'Neill, former prime minister of Papua New Guinea
Phelim (Felix) O'Neill
Phelim Caoch O'Neill (1517–1542), prince of the Cenél nEógain
Phelim O'Neill, 2nd Baron Rathcavan

R
Ralph Ambrose O'Neill, American flying ace from World War I
Rebecca O'Neill (born 1981), New Zealand football player
Richard O'Neill (disambiguation), several people
Riley O'Neill (born 1985), Canadian soccer player
Robert O'Neal (American football) (born 1971), former American football cornerback
Robert O'Neal (murderer) (1961–1995), American white supremacist and convicted murderer executed in Missouri
Robert O'Neill (disambiguation), several people
Robin O'Neil, British historian
Rose O'Neill (1874–1944), American illustrator
Ryan O'Neill (American soccer player) (born 1978), American soccer midfielder
Ryan O'Neill (Northern Irish footballer) (born 1990), Northern Irish footballer
Ralph T. O'Neal (1933–2019), British Virgin Islands politician
Reagan O'Neal, one of several pseudonyms of James Oliver Rigney Jr (born 1948), American writer
Ronan O'Neill, Irish Gaelic footballer
Ron O'Neal (1937–2004), American actor, director and screenwriter
Rose O'Neal Greenhow (1817–1864), Confederate spy
Ryan O'Neal (born 1941), American actor

S
Séamus Ó Néill (1910–1986), Irish writer
Shaquille O'Neal (born 1972), American basketball player
Shareef O'Neal (born 2000), American basketball player and son of Shaquille
Stanley O'Neal, American business executive
Steve O'Neal (born 1946), American football punter
Seán O'Neill (born 1938), Northern Irish Gaelic footballer
Sean O'Neill (table tennis), American table tennis player and coach
Shane O'Neill (Irish chieftain) (c. 1530–1567), Irish chief of the O'Neill clan of Ulster
Shane O'Neill (Irish exile) (c. 1599 – 29 January 1641), youngest son of Hugh O'Neill, Earl of Tyrone
Shane O'Neill (hurler) (born 1986), Irish sportsperson
Sharon O'Neill (born 1952), New Zealand singer-songwriter and pianist
Sid O'Neill, Australian rules footballer
Simon O'Neill (born 1971), New Zealand-born operatic tenor
Stephen O'Neill (born 1980), Irish Gaelic footballer
Steve O'Neill (1891–1962), American catcher, manager, coach and scout in Major League Baseball
Steve O'Neill (owner) (1899–1983), American owner of a professional baseball team
Steve O'Neill (rugby league), English rugby league footballer
Susie O'Neill (born 1973), Australian swimmer

T
Tara Lynne O'Neill, Northern Irish actress
Ted O'Neill, Dean of Admissions at the University of Chicago
Terence O'Neill, Baron O'Neill of the Maine (1914–1990), the fourth Prime Minister of Northern Ireland
Terry O'Neill (feminist) (born c. 1953), American attorney, professor and activist for social justice
Terry O'Neill (martial artist) (born 1948), English actor and martial artist
Terry O'Neill (photographer) (1938–2019), English photographer
Thomas Newman O'Neill Jr. (1928–2018), American federal judge
Thomas O'Neill (journalist) (1904–1971), American journalist
Thomas O'Neill (Canadian politician) (1882–1965), Canadian politician
Thomas P. O'Neill III (born 1945), American politician
Tim O'Neill (Canadian football) (born 1979), Canadian football player
Timothy O'Neill (soccer) (born 1982), American soccer player
Tip O'Neill (1912–1994), American politician
Tip O'Neill (baseball) (1858–1915), Canadian left fielder in Major League Baseball
Titus O'Neil (born 1977; real name Thaddeus Bullard), American professional wrestler
Todd O'Neill (born 1982), American singer
Tom O'Neill (ice hockey) (1923–1973), Canadian ice hockey player
Tommy O'Neill (born 1955), Scottish football midfielder
Tony O'Neill, New York-based musician and author
Tatum O'Neal (born 1963), American actress
Tirlough Brassileagh Ó Neill, son of Phelim Caoch O'Neill, Prince of the Cenél nEógain
Turlough Luineach Ó Neill (1532–1595), Irish earl of the Clan-Connell, inaugurated as the King of Tyrone
Ty O'Neal (born 1978), American actor

W
Ward O'Neill (born 1951), Australian illustrator, caricaturist and cartoonist
Wes O'Neill (born 1986), Canadian ice hockey player
Willa O'Neill, New Zealand actress
William O'Neill (Connecticut politician) (1930–2007), American Governor of Connecticut
William O'Neill (Ohio jurist) (born 1947), American lawyer, jurist and appellate judge
William O'Neill, 1st Baron O'Neill (1813–1883), Anglo-Irish hereditary peer, clergyman and musical composer
William T. O'Neil (1850–1909), New York politician
William J. O'Neil, American entrepreneur, stockbroker and writer
William O' Neil (1848–?), member of the Wisconsin Legislature

Y
Yvonne O'Neill (1936–2010), Canadian politician

Surnames
Lists of people by surname